The USS Arrowhead (AD-35) was a planned Shenandoah-class destroyer tender of the United States Navy during World War II. She was laid down at Puget Sound Naval Shipyard on 1 December 1944. Due to the defeat of Nazi Germany, and atomic bombings of Hiroshima and Nagasaki, her construction was cancelled on 11 August 1945, shortly before the war's end.

References

Shenandoah-class destroyer tenders